Tomatohead or Tomato Head may refer to:
Tomato Head Records, an American independent music record label
Tomatohead, a fictional turkey vulture in the children's TV series Zoboomafoo